Marco Cecchinato was the defending champion but chose not to defend his title.

Adam Pavlásek won the title after defeating Laslo Đere 7–6(7–1), 6–7(9–11), 6–4 in the final.

Seeds

Draw

Finals

Top half

Bottom half

References
Main Draw
Qualifying Draw

Garden Open - Singles
2018 Singles
Garden